is a former Japanese football player.

Playing career
Hirai was born in Kyoto on July 16, 1978. He joined J1 League club Kyoto Purple Sanga (later Kyoto Sanga FC) in 1997. He could not play at all in the match behind Shigetatsu Matsunaga until early 2000. He became a regular goalkeeper from the middle of 2000. However the club was relegated to J2 League end of 2000 season. Although he lost regular position behind Masahiko Nakagawa from the middle of 2001, the club returned to J1 League in a year. From 2002, he became a regular goalkeeper again and the club won the champions 2002 Emperor's Cup first major title in club history. After that, although the club results were bad, he played many matches until 2007. However the club gained Yuichi Mizutani in 2008 and Hirai he could hardly play in the match behind Mizutani. He retired end of 2010 season. In September 2017, when he coached Renofa Yamaguchi FC, he was registered as player because many goalkeeper could not play in the match. However he did not play in the match and his registration was deleted a week later. In March 2018, when he coached Kataller Toyama, he was registered as player because many goalkeeper could not play for injury. However he did not play in the match and his registration was deleted in April.

Coaching career
After retirement, Hirai started coaching career at Kyoto Sanga FC in 2011. He served as goalkeeper coach until 2012. In 2013, he moved to Ehime FC and coached until 2014. In 2015, he returned to Kyoto. In 2017, he moved to Renofa Yamaguchi FC. In 2018, he moved to Kataller Toyama.

Club statistics

References

External links

1978 births
Living people
Association football people from Kyoto Prefecture
Japanese footballers
J1 League players
J2 League players
J3 League players
Kyoto Sanga FC players
Renofa Yamaguchi FC players
Kataller Toyama players
Association football goalkeepers